Chemokine (C-C motif) ligand 28 (CCL28), also known as mucosae-associated epithelial chemokine (MEC), CCK1 and SCYA28, is a chemokine. CCL28 regulates the chemotaxis of cells that express the chemokine receptors CCR3 and CCR10.
CCL28 is expressed by columnar epithelial cells in the gut, lung, breast and the salivary glands and drives the mucosal homing of T and B lymphocytes that express CCR10, and the migration of eosinophils expressing CCR3.  This chemokine is constitutively expressed in the colon, but its levels can be increased by pro-inflammatory cytokines and certain bacterial products implying a role in effector cell recruitment to sites of epithelial injury. CCL28 has also been implicated in the migration of IgA-expressing cells to the mammary gland, salivary gland, intestine and other mucosal tissues.  It has also been shown as a potential antimicrobial agent effective against certain pathogens, such as Gram negative and Gram positive bacteria and the fungus Candida albicans.

Human CCL28 is encoded by an RNA transcript of 373 nucleotides and a gene with four exons. The gene codes for a 127-amino acid CCL28 protein with a 22-amino acid N-terminal signal peptide. It shares 76% nucleic acid identity and 83% amino acid similarity to the equivalent molecule in mouse. Sequence analysis has revealed CCL28 to be most similar to another CC chemokine called CCL27.

Gene neighbourhood 

The gene C5orf34 is found downstream of CCL28 and is a predicted to be in the Polo-like Kinase family. C5orf34 extends from base pair 43,486,701 to base pair 43,515,445.

References 

Cytokines